Antisleep Vol. 03 is the fourth studio album by American multi-genre project Blue Stahli, and the third  instrumental-based album, after Antisleep Vol. 01 and Antisleep Vol. 02, pre-orders became available on November 22, 2012, all pre-orders came with "Atom Smasher", the first officially released song on the album, and the full album was released on December 18, 2012.

Track listing

References 

2012 albums
Blue Stahli albums